Unrivaled is a documentary film that chronicles Sewanee: the University of the South's undefeated 1899 football team. The co-directors/producers of Unrivaled are David Crews and Norman Jetmundsen. The video editor is Matthew Graves. The script writer is Norman Jetmundsen.

At a time when most teams in the South played only a few games a year due to the costs of travel, the Sewanee Tigers played a schedule of 12 games in a 6-week period, with 9 games on the road. What sets them apart from every other college football season, however, is that they traveled 2,500 miles by steam locomotive and played 5 games in 6 days, winning all of them by shutout.
During that road trip, they played Texas in Austin on November 9; Texas A&M in Houston on November 10; Tulane in New Orleans on November 11, LSU in Baton Rouge on November 13; and Ole Miss in Memphis on November 14. It is unlikely any team will ever schedule such a road trip, let alone go undefeated. The season plays a prominent role in the university's history. As Sewanee Vice-Chancellor, John McCardell, noted:  "It's more than lore, it's true."

During that year, Sewanee also played Georgia, Tennessee and Southwestern Presbyterian (now Rhodes College) before the road trip, and after the trip, they still had 3 more games to play against Cumberland, Auburn (coached by John Heisman), and North Carolina. Sewanee went undefeated, and at the end of the season, the team had scored 227 points to its opponents' 10.

The film contains archival photos, letters, and newspaper accounts, as well as over a dozen original paintings by artist Ernie Eldridge, an original music score by Bobby Horton (who does much of the music for Ken Burns' documentaries), and narration by Gates Shaw. It also has interviews with such legendary coaches as Bobby Bowden, Johnny Majors, and Nick Saban, as well as Kirk Herbstreit, Tony Barnhart, Jon Meacham, Phil Savage, Kent Stephens from the College Football Hall of Fame, and Woody Register, professor of history at The University of the South. It also has interviews with a number of descendants of the team.

The film highlights the contributions of the team's student manager, 20-year old Luke Lea, the young head coach from Princeton, Billy Suter, and the players – known as the Iron Men – including team captain Henry "Ditty" Seibels, Ormond Simkins, William "Wild Bill" Claiborne, William "Warbler" Wilson, Ringland "Rex" Kilpatrick, Hugh "Bunny" Pearce, and Ralph "Rip" Black.  It also recognizes the work of two African-American trainers who also traveled with the team.

The film further recounts the developing game of football and why it became so popular in the South. It is worth noting that the game then was much more violent and brutal than today: football was a fast-paced running game with no forward passes, no huddles, scant protective gear, lots of punts, and no substitutions.

The film has already been accepted into several film festivals: Cobb International Film Festival (where it was named Best Local Film), Cookeville Film Festival, Birmingham Sidewalk Film Festival, Beaufort North Carolina Film Festival, Knoxville Film Festival (1st Place Documentary Feature Film & 1st Place Tennessee Documentary Film), and the Hollywood Gold Awards (Honorable Mention). It has also been broadcast on Public Television stations in twenty-four states, including Alabama, Mississippi, Georgia, Louisiana, South Carolina, Chattanooga, Nashville,   Memphis, Cookeville, Kentucky, and New Orleans. Unrivaled has been accepted by the National Educational Telecommunications Association ("NETA"), the national distributor for public television stations, which made the film available nationwide starting November 5, 2022.

References

External links

American short documentary films
Documentary films about American football
2022 films
2022 short documentary films